Farsian (also Romanized as Fārsīān, Fārseyān, and Fārsīyān) is a village in Cheshmeh Saran Rural District, Cheshmeh Saran District, Azadshahr County, Golestan Province, Iran. At the 2006 census, its population was 2,058, in 491 families.

References 

Populated places in Azadshahr County